Bellefonte may refer to:

Places in the United States
 Bellefonte, Alabama
 Bellefonte, Arkansas
 Bellefonte, Delaware
 Bellefonte, Kentucky
 Bellefonte, Pennsylvania

Other
 The Bellefonte Nuclear Generating Station in Hollywood, Alabama, United States
 USCGC Bellefonte (WYP-373), a United States Coast Guard patrol vessel in commission from April to August 1944 which also was in commission in the United States Fish and Wildlife Service as the fisheries research ship  from 1948 to 1959

See also
Bellefont, Kansas